Grand Colombier is a small, uninhabited island in the French North American territory of Saint Pierre and Miquelon. Only 50 ha in area, it lies 500 m off the north coast of Saint Pierre Island and rises to an elevation of 150 m. It is steep sided and treeless with rocky outcrops and a gently rolling top. The slopes are vegetated with grasses and ferns, while the top of the island is dominated by crowberry. It has been identified as an Important Bird Area (IBA) by BirdLife International because it supports a globally significant population of Leach's storm petrels. As of 2011, the island supports approximately 200,000 breeding pairs of Leach's storm petrels.

See also
Geography of Saint Pierre and Miquelon
List of Saint Pierre and Miquelon-related topics
Miquelon Island (Northeast Coast) Important Bird Area

References

Islands of Saint Pierre and Miquelon
Important Bird Areas of Saint Pierre and Miquelon
Seabird colonies